Brookhouse may refer to:

 Brookhouse, Lancashire, England
 Brookhouse, South Yorkshire, England
 Brookhouse Brook, a river in Epping Forest District, Essex
 Brookhouse Colliery, near Sheffield, Yorkshire
 Brookhouse Elementary School, a Canadian public school in Dartmouth, Nova Scotia
 Brookhouse School, Nairobi
 Graham Brookhouse (b. 1962), a British Olympic athlete

See also
 Brook House (disambiguation)